Jed Bews (born 14 December 1993) is an Australian rules footballer for the Geelong Football Club in the Australian Football League (AFL). He was drafted with the 86th pick in the 2011 AFL Draft  under the father-son rule. His father Andrew Bews also played for the Geelong Football Club he wore the number 27, Jed was offered this number but decided against it instead he was given number 24. Jed made his AFL debut in round 9 of the 2014 season against Fremantle. Bews plays primarily as a defender standing 186 cm tall and weighing in at 88 kg.

Prior to being drafted, Bews was a talented young athlete who competed as a pole vaulter, becoming a junior national champion and posting a best jump of 4.65 meters.

Statistics
Updated to the end of the 2022 season.

|-
| 2014 ||  || 24
| 7 || 0 || 0 || 30 || 30 || 60 || 17 || 25 || 0.0 || 0.0 || 4.3 || 4.3 || 8.6 || 2.4 || 3.6 || 0
|-
| 2015 ||  || 24
| 16 || 1 || 2 || 70 || 85 || 155 || 35 || 50 || 0.1 || 0.1 || 4.4 || 5.3 || 9.7 || 2.2 || 3.1 || 0
|-
| 2016 ||  || 24
| 8 || 0 || 2 || 51 || 48 || 99 || 35 || 21 || 0.0 || 0.3 || 6.4 || 6.0 || 12.4 || 4.4 || 2.6 || 0
|-
| 2017 ||  || 24
| 19 || 3 || 2 || 128 || 108 || 236 || 64 || 58 || 0.2 || 0.1 || 6.7 || 5.7 || 12.4 || 3.4 || 3.1 || 0
|-
| 2018 ||  || 24
| 21 || 2 || 2 || 124 || 106 || 230 || 72 || 37 || 0.1 || 0.1 || 5.9 || 5.0 || 11.0 || 3.4 || 1.8 || 0
|-
| 2019 ||  || 24
| 12 || 3 || 3 || 94 || 35 || 129 || 33 || 30 || 0.3 || 0.3 || 7.8 || 2.9 || 10.8 || 2.8 || 2.5 || 0
|-
| 2020 ||  || 24
| 20 || 3 || 2 || 146 || 72 || 218 || 65 || 35 || 0.2 || 0.1 || 7.3 || 3.6 || 10.9 || 3.3 || 1.8 || 1
|-
| 2021 ||  || 24
| 25 || 1 || 2 || 219 || 125 || 344 || 117 || 49 || 0.1 || 0.0 || 8.8 || 5.0 || 13.8 || 4.7 || 2.0 || 0
|-
| scope=row bgcolor=F0E68C | 2022# ||  || 24
| 23 || 1 || 2 || 134 || 115 || 249 || 79 || 43 || 0.0 || 0.1 || 5.8 || 5.0 || 10.8 || 3.4 || 1.8 || 0
|- class=sortbottom
! colspan=3 | Career
! 151 !! 16 !! 17 !! 996 !! 724 !! 1720 !! 516 !! 349 !! 0.1 !! 0.1 !! 6.6 !! 4.8 !! 11.4 !! 3.4 !! 2.3 !! 1
|}

Notes

Honours and achievements
Team
 AFL premiership player: 2022
 2× McClelland Trophy: 2019, 2022

References

External links

 
 
 Jed Bews statistics including TAC cup at sportingpulse.com

Living people
1993 births
Australian rules footballers from Victoria (Australia)
Geelong Falcons players
Geelong Football Club players
Geelong Football Club Premiership players
One-time VFL/AFL Premiership players